The Israel national roller hockey team is the national team side of Israel at international roller hockey. Usually is part of FIRS Roller Hockey B World Cup and CERH European Roller Hockey Championship.

Israel squad - 2012 FIRS Roller Hockey B World Cup

Team Staff
 General Manager:Pol Shnideman
 General Manager:

Coaching Staff
 Head Coach:Lucas Sorio
 Assistant:Marcelo Bandersky

Titles
FIRS Confederations Cup: (1)
2017

References

External links
website of Israel Roller Hockey

National Roller Hockey Team
Roller hockey
National roller hockey (quad) teams